Antoine Viquerat (born 5 October 1998) is a French swimmer. He competed in the men's 200 metre breaststroke at the 2020 Summer Olympics.

References

External links
 

1998 births
Living people
French male breaststroke swimmers
Olympic swimmers of France
Swimmers at the 2020 Summer Olympics
Place of birth missing (living people)
European Aquatics Championships medalists in swimming
Sportspeople from Boulogne-Billancourt